Salum Mayanga is a Tanzanian football coach.

In January 2017, he was announced manager of the Tanzania national football team replacing Charles Boniface Mkwasa.

References

Living people
Tanzania national football team managers
Year of birth missing (living people)
Tanzanian football managers